The Ackland Motorcycles Co is a defunct British motorcycle manufacturer. The company was founded by William Charles Ackland (1871-1942) in 1895 and originally manufactured cycles. The company was located on St. Mary's Road in Southampton. Ackland's son William George Ackland (1903-1994) later joined the company.

Motorcycle production
In 1919 Ackland started producing motorcycles. He used proprietary components from suppliers for the hubs, engine and gearbox. Whilst most similar manufacturers chose two-stroke engines from Villiers Engineering, Ackland used the more expensive, heavy-duty V-twins from JA Prestwich Industries (J.A.P.). Production lasted from 1919 to 1924, although bicycle production continued until 1936.

A restored 1922 example is on display at Southampton Museum. This particular machine has a 680 cc JAP engine,  a Sturmey Archer 3 speed box and carbide lighting.

References

Companies based in Southampton
Defunct motorcycle manufacturers of the United Kingdom
Defunct motor vehicle manufacturers of England
Vintage vehicles